Moisis Elisaf (17 July 1954 – 17 February 2023) was a Greek physician, academic, and politician. He served as mayor of Ioannina from September 2019 to his death in February 2023. He was Greece's first Jewish mayor.

Early life 
Elisaf was born in Ioannina on 17 July 1954, the son of Romaniote Jews and Holocaust survivors who had escaped the Nazi roundup which saw all but 9% of Ioannina's Jews deported to Auschwitz. After liberation, survivors suffered discrimination for their involvement in communist resistance groups such as the Greek People's Liberation Army. Elisaf graduated from the University of Athens in 1979.

Career
Elisaf was a physician and professor of internal medicine at Ioannina Medical School. He was the director of the school's Lipids, Atherosclerosis, Obesity, and Diabetes Department. Between 1993 and 1994, he worked at the Sackler Faculty of Medicine at Tel Aviv University. Several of his relatives live in Israel. He was the president of the Romaniote Jewish community of Ioannina for more than a decade and had previously served as the president of the Central Board of Jewish Communities in Greece. Elisaf also served on the city council and as the president of a cultural center.

Running as an independent, Elisaf obtained 50.3% of the vote during the second round of elections for mayor of Ioannina in June 2019, winning the election with 17,789 votes, 235 more than his runoff opponent. He took office in September, becoming the first Jewish mayor in the history of Greece. He said that he was a centrist who aimed to build consensus around policies for the city's development, such as improving infrastructure and public services. During his campaign, political opponents falsely claimed that he was a Mossad agent. He called the claims antisemitic but reaffirmed his belief that antisemitism in Greece is not a serious issue.

Personal life and death
Like most Jews in Ioannina, Elisaf was a non-religious Jew. He died from cancer on 17 February 2023, at age 68.

References

External links
 Official website (in Greek)
 Meet Moses Elisaf, The First Jewish Mayor In Greece, The Cradle Of Democracy, The Forward, July 2019

1954 births
2023 deaths
Greek pathologists
Jewish mayors
Greek medical researchers
Mayors of places in Greece
Romaniote Jews
Politicians from Ioannina
Jewish Greek politicians
Secular Jews
Independent politicians in Greece
National and Kapodistrian University of Athens alumni
Academic staff of Tel Aviv University
21st-century Jews
20th-century Jews
Deaths from cancer in Greece